As of February 2021, the International Union for Conservation of Nature (IUCN) lists 299 extinct species, 149 possibly extinct species, 14 extinct in the wild species, two possibly extinct in the wild species, eight extinct subspecies, one possibly extinct subspecies, and five extinct in the wild subspecies of mollusc.

Gastropods
There are 267 extinct species, 134 possibly extinct species, 14 extinct in the wild species, two possibly extinct in the wild species, five extinct subspecies, one possibly extinct subspecies, and five extinct in the wild subspecies of gastropod evaluated by the IUCN.

Patellogastropoda

Extinct species
Collisella edmitchelli
Eelgrass limpet (Lottia alveus)

Stylommatophora

Extinct species

Possibly extinct species

Extinct in the wild species

Extinct subspecies

Extinct in the wild subspecies

Littorinimorpha

Extinct species

Possibly extinct species

Sorbeoconcha

Extinct species

Possibly extinct species

Extinct in the wild species

Architaenioglossa

Extinct species

Possibly extinct species

Cycloneritimorpha

Possibly extinct species
Neritina tiassalensis

Hygrophila species

Extinct species

Possibly extinct species
Thickshell pondsnail (Stagnicola utahensis)

Bivalvia

There are 32 extinct species, 15 possibly extinct species, and three extinct subspecies of bivalve evaluated by the IUCN.

Extinct species

Possibly extinct species

Extinct subspecies

See also 
 List of least concern molluscs
 List of near threatened molluscs
 List of vulnerable molluscs
 List of endangered molluscs
 List of critically endangered molluscs
 List of data deficient molluscs

References 

Molluscs
Recently extinct molluscs
Recently extinct molluscs